Rafał Okoniewski (born 26 January 1980) is a Polish speedway rider and is the only  rider to win the U-19 European Championship twice, in 1998 and 1999.

He has been riding since 1996 and is the son of former speedway rider Mariusz (1956–2006).

Career details

World Championships 
 Individual Under-21 World Championship
 1998 - 9th place (7 points)
 1999 - 6th place (10+e points)
 2000 - 5th place (10 points)
 2001 - 3rd place (10+3 points)

European Championships 
 Individual Under-19 European Championship
 1998 - European Champion (15 points)
 1999 - European Champion (13+3 points)
 European Club Champions' Cup
 2009 -  Toruń - Winner (11 pts) Rivne

Polish competitions 
 Individual Polish Championship
 2009 - 8th place in Quarter-Final 3
 Individual Under-21 Polish Championship
 1999 - Polish Champion
 2000 - Polish Champion
 Golden Helmet
 2003 - Winner
 Silver Helmet (U-21)
 1997 - 2nd place
 1998 - Winner
 2001 - Winner
 Bronze Helmet (U-19)
 1997 - Winner
 1998 - Winner
 1999 - Winner

See also 
Polonia Bydgoszcz

External links 

 

1980 births
Living people
Polish speedway riders
Individual Speedway Junior European Champions
Polonia Bydgoszcz riders